My Aunt Aline is a 2007 Canadian comedy film directed by Gabriel Pelletier.

Plot
Geneviève Saint-Louis (Sylvie Léonard) is a successful career woman who does nothing but work. One day, her aunt Aline (Béatrice Picard) shows up unexpectedly on her doorstep penniless and just one step away from a retirement home. Determined to stay out, Aline turns Geneviève's life upside-down as she takes her on the ride of her life that includes a stop in Cuba.

Awards
Picard received a Genie Award nomination for Best Actress at the 28th Genie Awards. The film received two Jutra Award nominations at the 10th Jutra Awards, for Best Hair (Réjean Forget) and Best Makeup (Kathryn Casault); Forget won the award for Best Hair.

References

External links
 

2007 films
2007 comedy films
Canadian comedy films
Films directed by Gabriel Pelletier
French-language Canadian films
2000s Canadian films